Tmesisternus speciosus is a species of beetle in the family Cerambycidae. It was described by Francis Polkinghorne Pascoe in 1867.

Subspecies
 Tmesisternus speciosus speciosus Pascoe, 1867
 Tmesisternus speciosus jobiensis Gestro, 1876

References

speciosus
Beetles described in 1867